A Mother's Prayer is a 1995 film made for the USA Network starring Linda Hamilton, in a Golden Globe-nominated performance, as a woman who learns she has contracted the AIDS virus and must make plans for the care of her only son. The film, which counts Kate Nelligan, S. Epatha Merkerson and Bruce Dern in its supporting cast, premiered on August 2, 1995. It was eventually expanded, given a PG-13 rating and released on VHS via MCA/Universal Home Entertainment in 1996.

Cast
 Linda Hamilton ... Rosemary Holmstrom
 Kate Nelligan ... Sheila Walker
 Noah Fleiss ... T.J. Holmstrom
 Bruce Dern ... John Walker
 RuPaul ... Deacon "Dede"
 S. Epatha Merkerson ... Ruby
 Alex Kapp Horner ... Martha
 Corey Parker ... Spence Walker
 Jenny O'Hara ... Val
 Gail Strickland ... Ruth
McNally Sagal ... Dr. Kahn
Aaron Lustig ... Dr. Shapiro
Julie Garfield ... JoAnne Wasserman

Awards and recognition
 CableACE Awards—Won
Linda Hamilton
Actress in a Movie or Miniseries
1995

 Golden Globe Awards, The Hollywood Foreign Press—Nominated
Linda Hamilton
Best Performance by an Actress in a Mini-Series or Motion Picture Made for TV
1996 
 
Humanitas Prize
Lee Rose
1996 
 
Young Artist Awards—Nominated
Noah Fleiss
Best Performance by a Young Actor - TV Special
1996

References

External links

1995 films
American docudrama films
1995 drama films
HIV/AIDS in American films
HIV/AIDS in television
American drama television films
Films directed by Larry Elikann
1990s American films